Chumawi (also, Chu-ma-wa) is a former Shastan settlement in present-day Modoc County, northeastern California, United States. 

It was located in Big Valley of the Pit River, its precise location is unknown.

References

Shastan villages
Former settlements in Modoc County, California
Former Native American populated places in California
Lost Native American populated places in the United States